Ocenebrinae is a taxonomic subfamily of predatory sea snails, marine gastropod mollusks. This subfamily is within the large family Muricidae, which are commonly known as the murex and rock snails.

In one other version of current gastropod taxonomy, three of these genera are grouped by themselves in a small subfamily called Haustrinae.

Genera
Genera within the subfamily Ocenebrinae include:
 
 Acanthina Fischer von Waldheim, 1807
 Acanthinucella A. H. Cooke, 1918
 Africanella Vermeij & Houart, 1999
 † Argenthina G. S. Herbert & del Rio, 2005 
 Austrotrophon Dall, 1902
 Calcitrapessa S. S. Berry, 1959
 † Califostoma J. R. Bean & Vermeij, 2016
 † Carhuaspina DeVries, 2005 
 Ceratostoma Herrmannsen, 1846
 Chicocenebra Bouchet & Houart, 1996
 Chorus Bouchet & Houart, 1996
 Chorus giganteus
 Crassilabrum  Jousseaume, 1880
 Eupleura H. Adams & A. Adams, 1853
 † Fenolignum Vermeij & E. H. Vokes, 1997 
 Forreria Jousseaume, 1880
 Genkaimurex Kuroda, 1953
 Gracilipurpura Jousseaume, 1880
 Hadriania Bucquoy & Dautzenberg, 1882: synonym of Gracilipurpura Jousseaume, 1880
 † Herminespina DeVries & Vermeij, 1997 
 † Heteropurpura Jousseaume, 1880 
 Inermicosta Jousseaume, 1880
 Jaton Pusch, 1837
 † Jsowerbya Merle, 2005 
 † Lyropurpura Jousseaume, 1880 
 Mexacanthina Marko & Vermeij, 1999
 † Miocenebra E. H. Vokes, 1963 
 Muregina Vermeij, 1998
 † Namamurex A. Carrington & B. F. Kensley 
 Nucella Röding, 1798
 Ocenebra Gray, 1847
 Ocenotrophon McLean, 1995
 Ocinebrellus Jousseaume, 1880
 Ocinebrina Jousseaume, 1880
 Paciocinebrina Houart, Vermeij & Wiedrick, 2019
 Poropteron Jousseaume, 1880
 Pteropurpura Jousseaume, 1880
 Pterorytis Conrad, 1863 
 † Pterynopsis E. H. Vokes, 1972 
 Roperia Dall, 1898
 † Spinucella Vermeij, 1993 
 † Tactilispina DeVries, 2005 
 Trochia Swainson, 1840
 Urosalpinx W. Stimpson, 1865
 Vaughtia  Houart, 1995
 Vokesinotus Petuch, 1988
 Xanthochorus P. Fischer, 1884
 Zacatrophon Hertlein & Strong, 1951

Fossil genera:
 Ecphora
Gener a brought into synonymy
 Antimurex Cossmann, 1903: synonym of Crassilabrum Jousseaume, 1880 
 Centrifuga U. S. Grant & Gale, 1931: synonym of Pteropurpura Jousseaume, 1880
 Cerastoma [sic]: synonym of Cerostoma Conrad, 1837: synonym of Ceratostoma Herrmannsen, 1846 (misspelling of genus)
 Cerostoma Conrad, 1837: synonym of Ceratostoma Herrmannsen, 1846 (invalid: junior homonym of Cerostoma Latreille, 1802 [Lepidoptera]; Ceratostoma is an emendation )
 Dentocenebra Monterosato, 1917: synonym of Ocenebra Gray, 1847
 Hanetia: synonym of Urosalpinx Stimpson, 1865
 Jatova Jousseaume, 1880: synonym of Jaton Pusch, 1837 
 Microrhytis: synonym of Ceratostoma Herrmannsen, 1846
 Monoceros Lamarck, 1809: synonym of Acanthina Fischer von Waldheim, 1807 (Invalid: junior homonym of Monoceros Lacépède, 1798 [Pisces] and others)
 Neurarhytis Olsson & Harbison, 1953: synonym of Pterorytis Conrad, 1863 
 Ocenebrina Cossmann, 1903: synonym of Ocinebrina Jousseaume, 1880 (invalid: unjustified emendation of Ocinebrina)
 Ocinebra Leach, 1852: synonym of Ocenebra Gray, 1847 (incorrect subsequent spelling)
 Polytropa Swainson, 1840: synonym of Nucella Röding, 1798 (unaccepted > junior subjective synonym)
 Polytropalicus Rovereto, 1899: synonym of Nucella Röding, 1798 
 Ocinebrellus: synonym of Pteropurpura Jousseaume, 1880
 Poropteron: synonym of Pteropurpura Jousseaume, 1880
 Rudolpha Schumacher, 1817: synonym of Acanthina Fischer von Waldheim, 1807
 Shaskyus: synonym of Pteropurpura Jousseaume, 1880
 Spinostoma Coen, 1943: synonym of Ceratostoma Herrmannsen, 1846 
 Ternaria Coen, 1943: synonym of Pteropurpura (Ocinebrellus) Jousseaume, 1880: synonym of Ocinebrellus Jousseaume, 1880 (not available: no type species designated)
 Tritonalia J. Fleming, 1828: synonym of Ocenebra Gray, 1847 (Invalid: placed on the Official Index by ICZN Opinion 886)
 Unicornus Montfort, 1810: synonym of Acanthina Fischer von Waldheim, 1807

References

 NZ mollusca
  Barco, A.; Herbert, G.; Houart, R.; Fassio, G. & Oliverio, M. (2017). A molecular phylogenetic framework for the subfamily Ocenebrinae (Gastropoda, Muricidae). Zoologica Scripta. 46 (3): 322-335.

 
Muricidae